The Jurong Region Line (JRL) is a future Mass Rapid Transit (MRT) line that will serve the western part of Singapore. The JRL was first announced in 2013, and is set to open in stages from 2027 to 2029. The JRL will have 24 stations, serving Choa Chu Kang in the north, Jurong Pier in the south, Peng Kang Hill in the west and Pandan Reservoir in the east. An extension to Haw Par Villa station is under consideration. The line is coloured teal on the rail map. 

It will be the seventh MRT line in Singapore. It will run on CJ151 trains supplied by Hyundai Rotem, and a moving block signalling system supplied by Siemens. It will be the first MRT line to be fully elevated, and the fifth MRT line to be completely automated and driverless.

History

Origins and development
As early as 1996, consideration was given to provide a rail connection to the Nanyang Technological University (NTU) from the rest of Singapore. The white paper published by the Land Transport Authority indicated that a Light Rail Transit line would run west of Boon Lay station on the East West Line towards the university campus. The Jurong Region Line was first announced on 23 October 2001, but was subsequently put on hold.

It was only decided in 2013 that the line would be a Mass Rapid Transit line running from Choa Chu Kang, crossing Boon Lay and Tengah, Jurong East, Jurong Industrial Estate, and Jurong West, following plans to develop Tengah New Town.

Initial phases
The stations and alignment were announced on 9 May 2018 as a 24-kilometre line with 24 stations. The Choa Chu Kang Bus Interchange, Jurong East Bus Interchange and a HDB multi-storey car park with shops were acquired for the construction of the line. In addition, an LTA spokesman stated that an LRT line was no longer being considered, citing that LRT trains were unsuitable for the sharp turns and undulating terrain in the built-up areas being served by the Jurong Region Line.

Pioneer Primary School was also merged with Juying Primary School to facilitate a revised alignment of the line, which will run through the former school premises.

Construction began in 2020 and operations will commence in 3 phases, from 2027 to 2029.

On 6 April 2021, the Land Transport Authority (LTA) announced that construction works on four MRT stations on the Jurong Region Line would begin in the second quarter of 2021. The stations include Jurong Hill, Jurong Pier, Nanyang Gateway and Nanyang Crescent. The four stations are expected to be completed by 2029.

Construction of the JRL officially began with a groundbreaking ceremony on 13 January 2023.

West Coast extension
On 25 August 2015, transport minister Lui Tuck Yew announced the possibility of extending the JRL from Pandan Reservoir to connect with the Circle line at Haw Par Villa station via the Pasir Panjang area. The extension would improve connections between the western part of Singapore and the Central Business District.  If built, the extension would be completed in 2030. As of September 2022, feasibility studies are ongoing.

Network and operations

Route

The  JRL will serve 24 stations in Jurong and the west of Singapore. There are four branches: to Choa Chu Kang in the north, Jurong Pier in the south, Pandan Reservoir in the east and Peng Kang Hill in the west. Three of the branches are centred around Bahar Junction station.

Trains departing from Choa Chu Kang will switchback at Jurong Pier, then run towards Peng Kang Hill. Lastly, trains from Peng Kang Hill will switchback again and heading back to Choa Chu Kang, with Bahar Junction acting as an interchange point for the 3 converging services. The operation method will be similar to the Capital Airport Express in Beijing. Transfer to the east branch can only be done at Tengah.

Feasibility studies for an extension to connect the east branch to the Circle Line at Haw Par Villa are currently ongoing.

Stations
Notes: Names stated are working names, except for stations that are already opened.

Legend

List

Depots

Rolling stock

The JRL will be operated by a fleet of 62 trains manufactured by Hyundai Rotem. The trains, awarded under Contract CJ151, are fully-automatic and will run in a three-car formation. The fleet can be expanded to four-cars when ridership increases.

Due to the tight curves along the JRL route, the trains are smaller than those on the other lines. In addition, the trains will have two new systems – Condition Based Maintenance (CBM) and Automatic Track Inspection (ATI) – to allow monitoring of vehicles and maximise operational and maintenance efficiency. In the event of a power failure, the trains will have backup power systems to propel them to the nearest station.

The trains will be housed at a depot at Tengah. A stabling facility was to be located near Peng Kang Hill station, but has been put on hold as of May 2022. The Tengah Depot, which will also house the Operations Control Centre, will have a bus depot and a workers’ dormitory integrated with it to optimise land use. The Tengah Depot is located along the western perimeter of Tengah.

Train control
The Jurong Region Line will be equipped with Siemens Trainguard Sirius Communications-based train control (CBTC) moving block signalling system with Automatic train control (ATC) under Automatic train operation (ATO) GoA 4 (UTO). The subsystems consist of Automatic train protection (ATP) to govern train speed, Controlguide Rail 9000 Automatic Train Supervision (ATS) to track and schedule trains and Trackguard Westrace MK2 Computer-based interlocking (CBI) system that prevents incorrect signal and track points to be set.

Platform screen doors by Siemens provide safety for passengers, offering protection from arriving and departing trains.

Notes and references

Notes

References

External links
 Jurong Region Line

Mass Rapid Transit (Singapore) lines
Proposed public transport in Singapore
2027 in rail transport
2028 in rail transport
2029 in rail transport
Automated guideway transit